Diving was contested at the 1978 Asian Games in Bangkok, Thailand.

Medalists

Men

Women

Medal table

References 

Medalists

External links
Medals
Asian Games medalists

 
1978 Asian Games events
1978
Asian Games
1978 Asian Games